The Earthstar Thunder Gull is a family of cantilever high-wing, tricycle gear ultralight aircraft, manufactured by Earthstar Aircraft of Santa Margarita, California as a kit for amateur construction or as a completed aircraft.

Design and development
Designer Mark Beierle's original goals were an "airplane with the feel of a hang glider, the agility and visibility of a helicopter, the effortless smooth flight of a sailplane, and the utility and economy of a general aviation aircraft--all in the hopes of getting close to the feel and freedom of a bird." When queried by interviewer Don Downie if that was too much to ask, Beierle replied, "You bet! But it didn't stop me from trying."

The Thunder Gull was introduced in 1987 as a development of the earlier Laughing Gull.

The aircraft is constructed from aluminum tubing and sheet parts and covered in aircraft fabric. The aircraft can meet the requirements of the US FAR 103 Ultralight Vehicles category, including its maximum empty weight limitation of  when it is equipped with a lightweight engine.

The small wing gives the aircraft a high cruise speed and better resistance to turbulence than a lighter-loaded wing. The one-piece wing is quickly removable for storage or transport.

Reported construction time of the kit is 150 hours.

Operational history

Variants
Laughing Gull
Original model introduced in 1976. First models had wire bracing and later strut-bracing before development of the cantilever wing. Production completed.
Thunder Gull
Single-seat, high-wing ultralight aircraft with a cantilever  wing. The name was changed from Laughing Gull for marketing purposes. Production completed.
Thunder Gull J
Improved model with  wingspan. First flight was March 1987 and it was available as a kit or ready-to-fly. Production completed.
Thunder Gull JT2
Two seats in tandem model with dual controls and a  wingspan. The  Rotax 582 and  Rotax 618 two-stroke engines were optional. It was available as a kit or ready-to-fly and production is completed. First flight was June 1989.
Thunder Gull Odyssey
Two seats in an unusual staggered side-by-side configuration with dual controls in the form of a shared center stick and a  wingspan. The staggered seating was used to provide most of the benefits of side-by-side seating without the associated drag penalty. The seat stagger is sufficient to provide pilot shoulder clearance. The  HKS 700E has also been installed. It first flew in April 1995 and was introduced at Sun 'n Fun in 1995. It is available as a kit or ready-to-fly. Fifteen were reported completed by December 2011 and still in production in 2012. An electric aircraft version has been flown.
Soaring Gull
Motorglider version with  wingspan and 16:1 glide ratio. Standard engine was the  Rotax 277 and then later the  Hirth F-33. First flew in November 1993. Ten reported as completed by December 2011 and still in production in 2012.
Gull 2000
Updated version with  wingspan, wider cockpit enclosure built from fiberglass. Fifteen reported as completed by December 2011 and still in production in 2012.
eGull 2000
Electric powered variant

Specifications (Thunder Gull)

See also

References

External links

1980s United States ultralight aircraft
Single-engined pusher aircraft